Jan, Joan, Joannes or Johan Six van Chandelier (1620 – 1695) was a Dutch Golden Age poet from Amsterdam who travelled to Spa, France, Spain, Italy, and England. His collected works were republished in 1991.

Chandelier was born in Amsterdam as the oldest of 10 children and became a dried goods merchant. For his health he travelled to Spa in 1650 and for his work he travelled farther, writing poems wherever he was. Though his poetry was not his main occupation, it seems he was appreciated by contemporaries who mentioned his works. He was friends with H.L. Spiegel and Anslo. He also wrote a 'confession' to the playwright Jan Six, regent of the heerlijkheid of Vromade and Oudscheepen for his Muiderberg, which is a reference to his friend P.C. Hooft, who lived at Muiderslot and is known for the Muiderkring of writers.

Chandelier died in Amsterdam.

Works
 's Amsterdammers winter, 1650
 Spa-gedichten, 1656
 Poësy, 1657 (listed as a key text in the Canon of Dutch Literature)
 Davids Psalmen, 1674
 Erkentenisse, aan den eedelen heer Joan Six, heer van Vromaade, Oudscheepen, voor synen Muiderberg, 1676

References 

 Joan Six van Chandelier in Van der Aa
 Gedichten, Jan Six van Chandelier, A.E. Jacobs, Van Gorcum, 1991, 

1620 births
1697 deaths
17th-century Dutch poets
Writers from Amsterdam
Dutch Golden Age writers
Dutch male poets